The Divorce, Dissolution and Separation Act 2020 (c. 11) is an act of the Parliament of the United Kingdom which amends existing laws relating to divorce to allow for no-fault divorce in England and Wales.

The government held that the changes were the biggest reform of England and Wales's divorce laws since the Matrimonial Causes Act 1973, and that the laws would reduce the impact that allegations of blame could have on families, as under previous law one spouse was required to make accusations about the other's conduct in order to be granted a divorce.

Background
In 2018, the Supreme Court of the United Kingdom upheld a denial of a divorce petition in the case of Owens v Owens. The justices in the case were reluctant in coming to their findings and invited Parliament to reconsider the law on divorce. This led to the government announcing an intention to reform the law on divorce to remove the requirement to demonstrate irretrievable breakdown of a marriage with reference to one of the five grounds in s1 of the Matrimonial Causes Act 1973.

Provisions
Section 1 of the act amended the Matrimonial Causes Act 1973 allowing for parties to apply to the court for a divorce by stating that the marriage had broken down irretrievably without apportioning blame on either party.

Section 2 of the act provides for changes to the Matrimonial Causes Act 1973 where an application of judicial separation has been made and removes the requirement for factual grounds to be provided where a judicial separation is sought.

Sections 3 to 5 makes similar changes to the Civil Partnership Act 2004 to allow for the parties to apply to the court for dissolution by way of a statement that the civil partnership has broken down irretrievably.

The act shall only apply to England and Wales.

See also
No-fault divorce
Matrimonial Causes Act 1973
Civil Partnership Act 2004

References

External links
 Lexicology.com
 Familylaw.co.uk
 Parliament.uk
 Legislation.gov.uk

2020 in British law
Divorce law in the United Kingdom
United Kingdom Acts of Parliament 2020